Von der Tann may refer to:

 , an Imperial German Navy battlecruiser which served in World War I; launched in 1909 
 Von der Tann (gunboat), the first propeller-driven gunboat in the world; launched in 1849
 Hartmann von der Tann (born 1943), German journalist
 Ludwig Freiherr von und zu der Tann-Rathsamhausen (1815-1881), a Bavarian general who fought in several wars, and from whom the SMS Von der Tann took its name